Worthington Township is one of the eighteen townships of Richland County, Ohio, United States.  It is a part of the Mansfield Metropolitan Statistical Area.  The 2000 census found 2,791 people in the township, 1,870 of whom lived in the unincorporated portions of the township.

Geography
Located in the southeastern corner of the county, it borders the following townships:
Monroe Township - north
Green Township, Ashland County - northeast corner
Hanover Township, Ashland County - east
Brown Township, Knox County - southeast
Pike Township, Knox County - south
Berlin Township, Knox County - southwest corner
Jefferson Township - west
Washington Township - northwest corner

The village of Butler is located in western Worthington Township, and the unincorporated community of Newville lies in the township's northeast.

Name and history
It is the only Worthington Township statewide.

Government
The township is governed by a three-member board of trustees, who are elected in November of odd-numbered years to a four-year term beginning on the following January 1. Two are elected in the year after the presidential election and one is elected in the year before it. There is also an elected township fiscal officer, who serves a four-year term beginning on April 1 of the year after the election, which is held in November of the year before the presidential election. Vacancies in the fiscal officership or on the board of trustees are filled by the remaining trustees.

References

External links
County website

Townships in Richland County, Ohio
Townships in Ohio